Felicena dirpha is a butterfly of the family Hesperiidae. It is found in New Guinea.

Subspecies
Felicena dirpha dirpha
Felicena dirpha albicilla (Joicey & Talbot, 1917) (New Guinea)
Felicena dirpha nota Evans, 1949

External links
Insects of Papua New Guinea
Felicena dirpha nota image

Trapezitinae
Butterflies described in 1832